The Department of Training and Workforce Development is a department of the Government of Western Australia. The department is responsible for the growth of the Western Australian workforce through attraction and retention strategies, career development services and vocational and education training.

The department was one of the few that remained mostly unaffected by the 2017 restructuring of the Western Australian Government departments, which resulted in the number of departments being reduced from 41 to 25.

The department is led by Director General Karen Ho. The department was led by Director General Anne Driscoll from May 2017 to 14 March 2021, at which point Karen Ho took up the role in an acting capacity, because of Driscoll's retirement. The department was one of eight Western Australian Government departments to receive a new Director General at the time.

References

External links
 Government of Western Australia website
 Department of Training and Workforce Development

Training
2009 establishments in Australia
Government agencies established in 2009
Education in Western Australia
Western Australia